A country dance is a social dance form in which two or more couples dance together in a set.

Country Dance may also refer to:
 Country Dance (film), a 1970 British drama film
 The Country Dance, a painting by Jean-Antoine Watteau

See also
 Scottish country dance, the distinctively Scottish form of country dance
 Country Dance and Song Society